Nygolaimidae is a family of nematodes belonging to the order Dorylaimida.

Genera

Genera:
 Afronygus Heyns, 1968
 Aporcelaimoides Heyns, 1965
 Aquatides Heyns, 1968

References

Nematodes